Erik Heiberg (24 January 1916 – 30 December 1996) was a Norwegian sailor and Olympic medalist. He was born and died in Oslo. He received a silver medal in the 6 metre class with the boat Elisabeth X at the 1952 Summer Olympics in Helsinki, together with Johan Ferner, Finn Ferner, Tor Arneberg and Carl Mortensen.

References

External links

1916 births
1996 deaths
Norwegian male sailors (sport)
Olympic sailors of Norway
Sailors at the 1952 Summer Olympics – 6 Metre
Olympic silver medalists for Norway
Olympic medalists in sailing

Medalists at the 1952 Summer Olympics
Sportspeople from Oslo